The Bride and the Beast is a 1958 film by Ed Wood.

The Bride and the Beast may also refer to:

 The Bride and the Beast (novel), by Teresa Medeiros (2001)
 The Bride and the Beast (RiffTrax)